Dixebra is a rock band from Asturias, Spain. 

Dixebra was founded in 1987 in the Asturian city of Avilés with the idea of creating a rock band that would use the Asturian language in their lyrics with the aim of creating music that reflects the multiple realities of the country. The word dixebra is an Asturian word meaning division, isolation, independence... It has been traditionally used in the political rhetoric of Asturian nationalism. The band has a unique style, based on rock but mixing influences from a variety of modern genres (punk, reggae, ska, hip hop, funk...) and Asturian folk music.

Members

 Xune Elipe - vocals (1987-)
 Javi Rodríguez - bass (1990-)
 Primi Abella - electric guitar (1994-)
 Agustín Lara - trumpet (2001-)
 Eladio Díaz - sax (2001-)
 Sergio Rodríguez - beats, samples, producer (2002-)
 Jorge Cambareli - drums, percussion (2005-)
 Llorián García - electric and traditional bagpipes (2008-)
 Rubén Álvarez - electric guitar (2011-)

Discography
 Grieska - FonoAstur, 1990
 ¿Asturies o trabayes? - L'Aguañaz, 1993
 Apúntate a la llista - L'Aguañaz, 1995
 Dieron en duru - L'Aguañaz, 1997
 Glaya un país - L'Aguañaz, 2000
 Sube la marea - L'Aguañaz, 2002
 Cróniques d'un pueblu - L'Aguañaz, 2003 (book and compilation album)
 Ensin novedá - L'Aguañaz, 2005
 N'acción - L'Aguañaz, 2006 (live CD+DVD)
 Amor incendiariu - L'Aguañaz, 2009
 Tiempos modernos - L'Aguañaz, 2013

External links
 Official website

Spanish musical groups
Asturian music